Shahidul Alam (born 1955) is a Bangladeshi photojournalist, teacher and social activist. He has been a photographer for more than forty years and "his photographs have been published in almost every major western media outlet".

Alam founded the Drik Picture Library in 1989, the Pathshala South Asian Media Institute in Dhaka in 1998, "which has trained hundreds of photographers", and the Chobi Mela International Photography Festival in 1999. Alam is a visiting professor at the University of Sunderland in the UK. His books include Nature's Fury (2007) and My Journey as a Witness (2011).

In 2014 he was awarded the Shilpakala Padak by the President of Bangladesh and in 2018 the Humanitarian Award from the Lucie Awards.

On 5 August 2018, Alam was arrested and detained shortly after giving an interview to Al Jazeera and posting live videos on Facebook that criticized the government's violent response to the 2018 Bangladesh road safety protests. Many international humanitarian organisations and news media called for his release without charge. He was granted bail on 20 November 2018.
He was one of the persons of the year selected by Time magazine in 2018.

Early life and education

Childhood
Alam was born in Dhaka, East Pakistan (modern-day Bangladesh) in 1955. He grew up at Dhanmodi residential area of the same city. He was one of three siblings born to middle-class parents. His father was a scientist and his mother, a child psychologist. As a boy Alam was, easy to spot. In his childhood, he used to float through Dhaka's congested arteries atop his slight fold-up bicycle. He studied at the boarding school Jhenidah Cadet College.

University studies

Alam took his undergraduate education in the University of Liverpool. During his time in Liverpool he made a habit of walking in the streets in his lungi, a traditional South Asian garment. In his college year he was introduced to activism through his involvement with the Socialist Workers Party. He graduated from the university in 1976 by earning his BSc in biochemistry and genetics.

He relocated to London for his Doctor of Philosophy study at Bedford College, University of London. Alam started to take an interest in photograph during his time in London. At Bedford, he also worked as a research chemist to invent alternative printing processes for photographs. In 1983, he won the Harvey Harris Trophy from London Arts Council for a photograph that he took. This boosted his confidence in pursuing a career in photography. At the same year, he received his D.Phil in organic chemistry.

Career

In 1989, he set up Drik Picture Library and in 1998, Pathshala South Asian Institute of Photography (later Pathshala South Asian Media Institute), in Dhaka. Pathshala "has trained hundreds of photographers".

He started the Chobi Mela International Photography Festival in 1999 and remains a director. Alam has been a judge of the World Press Photo competition on four occasions, and was the first Asian chair of its judging panel. He was awarded an Honorary Fellowship of the Royal Photographic Society in 2001. He was a member of the jury board of The BOBs' award. "His photographs have been published in almost every major western media outlet, including the New York Times, Time magazine and National Geographic".

Alam set up the South Asian Media Academy. He has covered news events including natural disasters, governmental upheavals, the deaths of garment factory workers, human rights abuses, Bangladeshi government and military's repression and the "disappearances" of political opponents. His 2010 exhibition on extrajudicial killings named as Crossfire curated by Peruvian curator Jorge Villacorta has been widely acclaimed, but was closed down by the police leading to nationwide protests. The police barricade was removed after Drik's lawyers served legal notice on the government. The court's response and subsequent events enabled Drik to open the exhibition for public viewing on 31 March.

In 2010, he co-curated the exhibition Where Three Dreams Cross at Whitechapel Gallery in London. In 2012, he participated in the inaugural Kochi-Muziris Biennale held in Kerala, India.

He is a visiting professor at the University of Sunderland in the UK.

Crossfire 
Crossfire is a series of photographs taken by Shahidul Alam, a Bangladeshi photographer, activist, and teacher. The exhibit was curated by one of Alam's colleagues, Jorge Villacorta, and was completed in 2010 and displayed at the Drik Gallery in Dhaka, Bangladesh. The photographs show locations and objects where extrajudicial killings happened because of Bangladesh's Rapid Action Battalion (RAB). Human Rights Watch has called RAB a "death squad" because of these reported killings. RAB was established in 2004 as a paramilitary force to combat gangsters and thugs in the streets, but in late 2007, the battalion was accused of over 350 extrajudicial killings and the torturing of hundreds more. Before the exhibit opened to the public, RAB and local police closed the Drik Gallery because they believed the photographs would “create anarchy”.

Arrest and bail
On 5 August 2018, Alam was taken from his home in Dhanmondi shortly after giving an interview to Al Jazeera and posting live videos on Facebook that criticized the government's violent response to the 2018 Bangladesh road safety protests. Alam had said the protests "stemmed from anger about widespread government corruption, and not just the bus accident that initially sparked them." He was shown arrested by the Dhaka Metropolitan Police the next day. Alam claims he was tortured.

Amnesty International and the Committee to Protect Journalists urged the Bangladeshi government to immediately release Alam without filing charges, as did Mumbai Press Club, Bombay News Photographer Association, Reporters Without Borders, Noam Chomsky, Arundhati Roy, Abdul Sattar Edhi's son Faisal Edhi, and PEN International. William Nicholas Gomes, a human rights defender and freelance journalist wrote an open letter to Bangladesh's ambassadors demanding the release of Alam. William Nicholas Gomes also wrote to Michelle Bachelet, the UN High Commissioner for Human Rights on the 100 days of incarceration of Shahidul Alam requesting a country visit to Bangladesh. As many as 426 academics from various universities in Australia urged the Government of Bangladesh to release him immediately. On the other hand, Sajeeb Wazed, the son of Bangladeshi Prime Minister Sheikh Hasina, questioned those defending and demanding freedom of Alam in a controversial Facebook post.

Alam was released from prison on 20 November 2018 after being granted bail by Bangladesh High court.

Publications

Publications by Alam
Nature's Fury. Hibrida; London: Concern Worldwide, 2007. . Text in English and Urdu.
Portraits of Commitment. UNAIDS, 2009.
My Journey as a Witness. Skira, 2011. Edited by Rosa Maria Falvo. .
The Tide Will Turn. Göttingen, Germany: Steidl, 2019. .

Other publications
Blink: 100 photographers, 10 curators, 10 writers. New York: Phaidon, 2002. 2004, . Alam was a joint curator.
Under the Banyan Tree. Dhaka, Bangladesh: Pathshala, South Asian Media Academy, 2011. Edited by Alam. .
Ways of Life. Dhaka, Bangladesh: Drik Picture Library, 2014. Edited by Alam. . With an introduction by Rubana Huq.

Awards
2014: Shilpakala Padak, Shilpakala Academy, Dhaka, Bangladesh
2018: Humanitarian Award, Lucie Awards
 2018: Tribute Award, Frontline Club, UK for his contribution to journalism
2019 : Special Presentation Award 2019, International Center of Photography (ICP)
 CPJ International Press Freedom Awards 2020

References

External links
  
 

1955 births
Living people
Bangladeshi photojournalists
Alumni of the University of London
Alumni of the University of Liverpool
Bangladeshi bloggers
People from Dhaka